Selma City Schools is a school district - for public schools - headquartered in Selma, Alabama, United States. It serves the entire city.

Schools

High schools 
 Selma High School

Middle schools 
 R.B. Hudson Middle School (7th and 8th Grades)
 School of Discovery (6th Grade)

Elementary schools 
 Byrd Elementary School
 Cedar Park Elementary School
 Clark Elementary School
 Edgewood Elementary School
 Sophia P. Kingston Elementary School
 Knox Elementary School
 Meadowview Elementary School
 Payne Elementary School

Failing schools 

Statewide testing ranks the schools in Alabama. Those in the bottom six percent are listed as "failing." As of early 2018, both Selma High School and R.B.Hudson Middle School were included in this category.

See also 

 John T. Morgan Academy, a private school in Selma City.

References

External links 
 Selma City Schools

Education in Dallas County, Alabama
School districts in Alabama
Education in Selma, Alabama